Bellefont-La Rauze is a commune in the department of Lot, southern France. The municipality was established on 1 January 2017 by merger of the former communes of Laroque-des-Arcs (the seat), Cours and Valroufié.

See also 
Communes of the Lot department

References 

Communes of Lot (department)